Arnold Wright (1858–1941)  was from 1888 to 1900 the London editor of the Yorkshire Post.

He was trained for journalism under his father, and in 1879 he went to India to take work on the Times of India.

In Australia he was private secretary to Anna Brassey and was on board the Sunbeam when she died. After her death he was involved in the production of her posthumously published work The Last Voyage.

After leaving the Yorkshire Post he wrote and edited a number of travel reference books, notably the Twentieth Century Impressions series. He visited Ceylon in 1906, to complete that edition of the series.

Wright was also the part author of Parliament, Past and Present

In 1933 he was awarded a Civil list pension in recognition of his literary work.

Works
 
 Twentieth Century Impressions – Editor in Chief or Historian in most volumes between 1901 and 1914

Notes

References
 The Times (London, England), Monday, 17 Feb. 1941; pg. 7; Issue 48852.

English writers
1858 births
1941 deaths
English journalists